Ambagamuwa Divisional Secretariat is a  Divisional Secretariat  of Nuwara Eliya District, of Central Province, Sri Lanka.

References
 Divisional Secretariats Portal

Divisional Secretariats of Nuwara Eliya District
Geography of Nuwara Eliya District